Brind is a hamlet in the East Riding of Yorkshire, England, forming part of the civil parish of Wressle. The single track tarmac road (Brind Lane) runs through the entire hamlet, and joins the Wressle road to the north.
In 1823 Brind with Newsholme was in the parish of Wressle, the Wapentake of Harthill and the Liberty of Howdenshire. Population at the time was 177.

References

Villages in the East Riding of Yorkshire